Pluty may refer to the following places:
Pluty, Gmina Paprotnia in Masovian Voivodeship (east-central Poland)
Pluty, Podlaskie Voivodeship (north-east Poland)
Pluty, Subcarpathian Voivodeship (south-east Poland)
Pluty, Gmina Wiśniew in Masovian Voivodeship (east-central Poland)
Pluty, Greater Poland Voivodeship (west-central Poland)
Pluty, Warmian-Masurian Voivodeship (north Poland)
Pluty, West Pomeranian Voivodeship (north-west Poland)